The 1904 Svenska Mästerskapet Final was played on 16 October 1904 between the seventh-time finalists Örgryte IS and the first-time finalists Djurgårdens IF. The match decided the winner of 1904 Svenska Mästerskapet, the football cup to determine the Swedish champions. Örgryte IS won their sixth title with a 2–1 victory at Idrottsparken in Stockholm.

Route to the final

Örgryte IS 

Örgryte was drawn against Göteborgs IF in the preliminary round and won, 4–1, at home on 10 August 1904. On 18 September 1904, Örgryte beat IFK Norrköping in the quarter-final at home in Gothenburg, 5–0. In the away-game semi-final on 25 September 1904, Örgryte won against Östermalms IF from Stockholm: 3–2 ended the match.

Örgryte made their seventh appearance in a Svenska Mästerskapet final, having won five, lost one, and only missed two.

Djurgårdens IF 

Djurgårdens IF entered in the qualifying round and won against IF Drott on 24 July 1904 at home in Stockholm, 4–0. On 28 August 1904, Djurgården played against Norrmalms SK in the preliminary round and won 2–0 at home. Gefle IF was beaten 1–0 in the quarter-final on 11 September 1904 away in Gävle. In the semi-final, Djurgården won, 3–2, against AIK at home on 25 September 1904.

Djurgården made their first Svenska Mästerskapet final.

Match details

References 

Print

1904
1904 in Swedish football
Djurgårdens IF Fotboll matches
Örgryte IS matches
Football in Stockholm
October 1904 sports events
Sports competitions in Stockholm
1900s in Stockholm